is a Japanese model and actress from Tokyo. Her father is Taiwanese of Japanese descent and her mother is Hawaiian of Japanese descent, lending to her legal name Leilani (Hawaiian for 'heavenly lei'), and making her half-Japanese. Her first major role was as Yuka Osada, the Crane Orphnoch, in Kamen Rider 555.

External links
Talent profile
Personal blog

Japanese actresses
Japanese gravure models
Japanese female models
Japanese television personalities
1985 births
Living people
Japanese people of American descent
Japanese people of Chinese descent
Models from Tokyo Metropolis